The Journal of Biomedical Nanotechnology is a monthly peer-reviewed scientific journal covering fundamental and applied research pertaining to nanotechnology applications in all fields of the life sciences. It was established in 2005 and is published by American Scientific Publishers, a company identified by Jeffrey Beall as a predatory publisher. The editor-in-chief is Zhiyong Qian.

References

External links 
 

Nanomedicine journals
Monthly journals
Publications established in 2005
English-language journals